The 2011–12 NC State Wolfpack men's basketball team represented NC State University in the 2011–12 men's college basketball season. The team was led by Mark Gottfried and played its home games at the RBC Center in Raleigh, NC as members of the Atlantic Coast Conference. They finished the season 24-13 overall, 9-7 in ACC play, finishing in a three-way tie for fourth place. As a No. 5 seed in the 2012 ACC men's basketball tournament, they defeated Boston College in the first round and Virginia in the quarterfinals before falling to North Carolina in the semifinals. They received an at large bid to the 2012 NCAA Division I men's basketball tournament, where they beat San Diego State in the second round and Georgetown in the third round before falling to Kansas in the Sweet Sixteen.

Class of 2011 Commits

Roster

Schedule and results

|-
!colspan=9| Exhibition

|-
!colspan=9| Regular Season

|-
!colspan=9| ACC Regular Season

|-
!colspan=9| 2012 ACC men's basketball tournament

|-
!colspan=9| 2012 NCAA Division I men's basketball tournament

References

Nc State
NC State Wolfpack men's basketball seasons
Nc State
2011 in sports in North Carolina
2012 in sports in North Carolina